Kaidipang is a Philippine language spoken in North Sulawesi (Celebes), Indonesia.

References

Gorontalo–Mongondow languages
Languages of Sulawesi